"Butt Out" is the thirteenth episode of the seventh season of the American animated television series, South Park, and is the 109th episode overall. It first aired on Comedy Central in the United States on December 3, 2003.

In the episode, representatives from the anti-smoking campaign rap about the dangers of smoking for the children of South Park. For fear of growing up to be giant nerds, the boys decide to take up the nasty habit.

The episode pokes fun at the formulaic storyline of some South Park episodes (including the movie), which start with the boys getting themselves in trouble and inciting a controversy between the townsfolk and a national interest group (or a major catastrophe) while trying to avoid punishments, subsequently learning a lesson from this conflict.

Plot
An overly upbeat anti-smoking music group called Butt Out, which incorporates elements of dance and hip-hop into its routine, performs at South Park Elementary. The boys are put off by the annoying unoriginality and lame, condescending nature of the performance, in which the performers proclaim that, if everyone refuses to smoke, they can grow up to be "just like [them]". The boys take this literally and go behind the school to start chain smoking, which they do, despite it causing them to cough furiously. When their school counselor, Mr. Mackey, approaches, the boys discard their still-lit cigarettes into a nearby dumpster, which causes a fire that burns down the entire school. When the boys are brought before the principal and their parents, the adults are initially enraged and ashamed not at the school burning down, but at the boys smoking (in fact, the school burning down is never acknowledged by either the principal or the parents). They then convince themselves that the blame lies with the tobacco companies, whose advertising campaigns have influenced the kids. The boys happily transfer the blame to avoid punishment, but Kyle recognizes the pattern of a South Park storyline and unsuccessfully tries to get his friends to avoid the coming calamity. The town summons celebrity spokesman Rob Reiner to combat the spread of smoking among children in South Park. Despite the fact that Reiner is vehemently against smoking and willing to tell everyone how unhealthy it is, he is extremely gluttonous and disrespectful to those who do not share his viewpoints, constantly eating junk food and taking pride on imposing his will on others. Cartman, however, comes to look up to Reiner precisely because of this.

Reiner disguises himself as a woman (wearing a wig, but not shaving his massive beard) and takes the boys on a tour of a tobacco factory. The vice president teaches them the history of tobacco, and explains that, as the dangers of smoking have been made known, the surgeon general mandated warning labels on cigarettes so those who choose to smoke or not can make informed choices, which Kyle finds reasonable. Reiner reveals himself after snapping a picture of the boys, and throws one of the employees over the railing to the factory floor before fleeing. Reiner takes the boys back to his anti-smoking encampment and tells them he is going to introduce them to some really "decent and caring" people of his "Anti-Smoking" staff, who are shown to be pale, hunched-over, hissing, and dressed in black. Reiner intends to Photoshop the photograph in order to falsely depict the executive giving cigarettes to kids. By now, Stan, Kyle, and Kenny are disgusted with Reiner and his tactics, so when Reiner offers them the opportunity to appear in an anti-smoking TV commercial, they decline, but Cartman eagerly agrees.

Cartman appears in the commercial to claim he is dying of lung cancer from secondhand smoke, but discovers at the end of the shoot that Reiner and his group intend to kill him and claim it actually was from lung cancer. Cartman flees to his friends, who, at first, refuse to help him when they learn that Reiner plans to kill him, fearing that they will be killed, as well, if he were to be found with them.  Eventually, however, they relent and decide to help him, after all. They consider taking him back to the cigarette factory, as they know that the vice president there will not support Reiner's plan and will protect Cartman from him. Kyle again warns that this is following a formula, and it will lead to a confrontation between the town and the factory, where they will have to admit they lied about why they smoked and talk about what they have learned. However, the group goes to the factory, anyway, knowing that it is the only way to keep Cartman safe, and the townspeople confront them with Reiner (who is eating an entire cake). The townspeople turn on Reiner when he tells them his plan (with Stan's father, Randy, even telling him outright that killing Cartman is "not right") and, as he attempts to explain why it is acceptable, Kyle goes into a speech (which he briefly breaks almost immediately to comment to Stan, "See? I knew it.") about people needing to take responsibility for their actions, and calls Reiner a fascist for imposing his will on others. Now deciding that he no longer respects Reiner, Cartman stabs him with a fork, revealing "Reiner" to be a boneless sac filled with green goo, who completely drains. The parents then ground the four, as they now know they smoked of their own will, and though Stan is relieved that the ordeal is over and the four have "learned [their] lesson", Kyle disappointedly replies, "No, we didn't, dude. No, we didn't."

Production
"Butt Out" was written and directed by Trey Parker. Matt Stone said the episode was inspired by a desire to spoof both California's strict smoking bans and film director Rob Reiner; Stone said, "We try not to be, 'All right, here's the point we want to make.' But things like California's smoking ban and Rob Reiner animate both of us. When we did that Rob Reiner episode, to us it was just common sense. Rob Reiner was just a great target."

A television promo for the episode showed a deleted scene involving Butters interacting with the "Butt Out" group.

Theme
The episode satirizes anti-smoking education presentations by external providers that come across as cheesy or irritating to the young adult demographic they target, effectively negating any message they might be trying to send across. The episode also satirizes adult pretension, a common theme in South Park episodes, in their ineffective and nonsensical responses to the smoking problem in South Park. According to Brian C. Anderson, it also lampoons the pretentiousness of the Hollywood movie industry and liberalism, particularly through the use of Rob Reiner, the real-life American director widely known for advocating smoking restrictions. Reiner and, by extension, Hollywood adopts a holier-than-thou attitude with regard to smokers, and show a lack of understanding toward the poor and middle-class. The episode advocates accepting personal responsibility for smoking rather than blaming the tobacco industry or external forces like Hollywood and television (which are often accused of condoning and glamorizing drug use, particularly with alcohol and tobacco); as such, tobacco executives are portrayed as reasonable and decent, while Reiner and Hollywood representatives are nasty and elitist. Another theme is Rob Reiner constantly eating and overweight to the point that he can't fit through a car door, pointing out that although fast food is as dangerous as smoking, it is overlooked.

Although it was legal to smoke inside of bars in Colorado at the time of the episode's airing in 2003, the state would later ban smoking in most public places in 2006, including bars.

Reception
"Butt Out" received mostly positive reviews. Conservative writer Brian C. Anderson praised the episode saying the portrayal of Reiner, Hollywood and their anti-smoking efforts "perfectly captures the Olympian arrogance and illiberalism of liberal elites." Anderson said this was particularly illustrated by a scene in the episode in which Reiner yells at a sawmill worker for smoking in a bar, and tells him he should relax by spending time in an expensive vacation house like Reiner does. Anderson described it as a "classic sequence".

Amanda Kiser of The Battalion praised the episode's portrayal of anti-smoking educational performances: "Watch the 'Butt Out' episode of South Park if you were not fortunate enough to witness such a spectacle as a preteen. Granted, the truth is substantially less ridiculous, but it is still incredibly, nauseatingly self-consciously hip." Richard Ives of Times Higher Education also praised this aspect of this episode: "Teachers to whom I've shown these clips sigh in recognition." The Daily Record of Scotland praised the episode, which they said was extremely "timely".

In a 2017 Reddit interview with fans, when asked of his portrayal in the episode, actor Rob Reiner's reply was "I thought it was funny, but I'm not quite that fat."

References

External links

 "Butt Out" Full episode at South Park Studios
 

South Park (season 7) episodes
Works about the tobacco industry